Petar Đuričković (Serbian Cyrillic: Петар Ђуричковић; born 20 June 1991) is a Serbian professional footballer who plays as an attacking midfielder for Serbian club Kolubara Lazarevac.

Career
Prior to his transfer, he was a member of the Serbian champions since June 2016, won a double crown and played a total of 38 matches for Partizan in all competitions (2 goals, 4 assists). On 22 December 2017, he signed a two and a half year contract with Greek Super League club Xanthi for an undisclosed fee, and after a successful period in Greece he signed a one-year contract with Serbian club Radnički Niš on 30 September 2020. On 8 September 2021, he signed a 1 year contract with FK Napredak Kruševac. On 24 September 2022, he signed a one year contract with FK Kolubara Lazarevac.

Honours
Red Star
Serbian Cup: 2011–12

Partizan
 Serbian SuperLiga: 2016–17
 Serbian Cup: 2016–17

References

External links
 
 Petar Đuričković stats at utakmica.rs
 

1991 births
Living people
Sportspeople from Pristina
Kosovo Serbs
Association football midfielders
Serbian footballers
Red Star Belgrade footballers
FK Radnički 1923 players
FK Radnički Niš players
FK Partizan players
Xanthi F.C. players
FK Napredak Kruševac players
Serbian SuperLiga players